OFW Diaries is a Philippine television documentary show broadcast by GMA Network. Hosted by Kara David, it premiered on March 13, 2009 replacing Emergency. The show concluded on January 14, 2011 with a total of 104 episodes. It was replaced by Tunay na Buhay in its timeslot.

Ratings
According to AGB Nielsen Philippines' Mega Manila People/Individual television ratings, the final episode of OFW Diaries scored a 2.1% rating.

References

2009 Philippine television series debuts
2011 Philippine television series endings
Filipino-language television shows
GMA Network original programming
GMA Integrated News and Public Affairs shows
Philippine documentary television series